The 
Yogoberry is the largest Brazilian chain of frozen yogurt and smoothie stores, founded in 2007 in Rio de Janeiro by the South Korean sisters Un Ae Hong and Jong Ae Hong.

The chain has more than 24 stores throughout Brazil, and two stores in Iran.

History
The franchise was created by the sisters Un Ae Hong, a former flight attendant on Varig, and Jong Ae Hong, a nutritionist, both South Korean naturalized Brazilians. The entrepreneurs, who lived in California, realized the growing popularity of frozen yogurt in the United States.  Un Ae and Jong Ae believed that the success of the product would be the same in Brazil, where the population is also concerned about seeking a healthy diet.

Jong Ae used her knowledge of nutrition to adapt the formula of frozen yogurt to the Brazilian taste and after more than a year of research to assess the market and the public, Yogoberry opened its first shop in Ipanema, Rio de Janeiro in 2007.

In 2010 the company signed a multi-year contract to expand the brand in the Middle East and in 2011 with the help of their master franchisee Biaoboro Bastani PJS, Yogoberry opened its very first international shop in Tehran, Iran, which was inaugurated by Ambassador Antonio Luis Espinola Salgado of Brazil.

In 2017 Biaoboro Bastani PJS signed its first sub-franchise for the city of Bandar Abbas which was inaugurated on 30 January 2018 by His Excellency, Ambassador Rodrigo de Azeredo Santos of Brazil.

See also
 List of frozen yogurt companies

References

External links
 Official website

Fast-food franchises
Ice cream parlors
Fast-food chains of Brazil
Food and drink companies based in Rio de Janeiro (city)
Dairy products companies of Brazil
Brazilian brands
Restaurants established in 2007
Frozen yogurt businesses